Peter Iacangelo Jr. (August 13, 1948 – November 17, 2021) was an American film, stage and television actor. He was perhaps best known for playing the role of Lou, the incensed owner of Lou's Tavern in the 1999 film Fight Club.

Life and career 
Iacangelo was born in Brooklyn, New York on August 13, 1948. He attended Hofstra University. Iacangelo began his acting career in 1976, appearing in the Broadway play Threepenny Opera.

Iacangelo made his screen debut in the 1978 film Bloodbrothers. In 1980 he appeared in an American production of the play Filumena.

From the 1980s to 1999 Iacangelo appeared and guest-starred in numerous film and television programs including The Drew Carey Show, Cheers (and its spin-off The Tortellis), Hanky Panky, Hill Street Blues, Night of the Running Man, Taxi, Hardcastle and McCormick, St. Elsewhere, Look Who's Talking Now, Quantum Leap, Archie Bunker's Place, Becker, Cagney & Lacey, Truth or Consequences, N.M., St. Elsewhere, Hero at Large, Who's the Boss?, The Jeffersons, They Came from Outer Space, Murphy Brown, ALF, We're Talking Serious Money, Mr. Belvedere, Dear John, Family Matters and Tattoo. He retired in 1999, last appearing in the film Fight Club, playing the role of the bartender Lou.

Iacangelo died in West Columbia, South Carolina on November 17, 2021, at the age of 73.

Filmography

Film

Television

References

External links 

Rotten Tomatoes profile

1948 births
2021 deaths
20th-century American male actors
American male film actors
American male stage actors
American male television actors
American theatre people
Hofstra University alumni
People from Brooklyn